Hulen is a surname. Notable people with the surname include:

Billy Hulen (1870–1947), American baseball player
John Augustus Hulen (1871–1957), American lieutenant general
Rubey Mosley Hulen (1894–1956), American judge

See also
Helen (given name)